Amblyptilia forcipata is a moth of the family Pterophoridae that is known from India (Sikkim and Darjeeling).

References

Amblyptilia
Moths described in 1867
Endemic fauna of India
Moths of Asia